Kurier (the German term for courier or messenger) could refer to:

 Kurier – an Austrian newspaper
 Berliner Kurier – a Berlin newspaper
 Der Kurier – a former West Berlin Newspaper which appeared shortly after World War II
 Kurier system, a World War II burst transmission system for the German Navy
 Russian Kurier, a company involved in the Itar-Tass Russian News Agency v. Russian Kurier, Inc. case